Plant Science is a peer-reviewed scientific journal of plant biology. The journal was originally established as Plant Science Letters in 1973, changed its name to Plant Science in 1986.

The journal is published by Elsevier and is currently edited by Eduardo Blumwald, Erich Grotewold, Liwen Jiang, David Wendehenne.

Abstracting and indexing
The journal is abstracted and indexed in the following bibliographic databases:

According to the Journal Citation Reports, the journal has a 2017 impact factor of 3.712.

References

External links

Publications established in 1973
English-language journals
Botany journals
Elsevier academic journals
Monthly journals